The 1935–36 Ljubljana Subassociation League was the 17th season of the Ljubljana Subassociation League. SK Ljubljana won the league for the first time.

Ljubljana subdivision

Maribor subdivision

Final

References

External links
Football Association of Slovenia 

Slovenian Republic Football League seasons
Yugo
2
Football
Football